List of British Jewish writers is a list that includes writers (novelists, poets, playwrights, journalists, authors of scholarly texts and others) from the United Kingdom and its predecessor states who are or were Jewish or of Jewish descent.

Authors, A-J 
Gerhard Adler (14 April 1904 – 23 December 1988), of German Jewish ancestry, was a major figure in the world of analytical psychology who had a significant effect on popular culture in England; known for his translation into English from the original German and editorial work on the Collected Works of Carl Gustav Jung.
 Grace Aguilar, novelist and poet
Geoffrey Alderman (born 10 February 1944); historian that specialises in 19th and 20th centuries Jewish community in England; also a political adviser and journalist; although he is a Conservative Zionist supporter of Israel with controversial views on Palestinians, Alderman has made guest appearances on Iran's PressTV channel. In 2011, he made four such appearances and donated his appearance fees of £300 to Israel. Of Alderman's dozen or so books, the best-known is Modern British Jewry (second edition, 1998, OUP). He has also written for the New Dictionary of National Biography, with special responsibility for post-1800 Jewish entries, and for The Guardian and The Jewish Chronicle. He is a columnist for the Jewish Telegraph.
 Naomi Alderman, novelist, winner of the 2006 Orange Award for new writers 
 Rose Allatini, novelist. (Also wrote under the names A.T. Fitzroy, Lucian Wainwright and Eunice Buckley.)
Mick Anglo (born Maurice Anglowitz, 19 June 1916 – 31 October 2011), of Russian Jewish ancestry, was a British comic book writer, editor and artist, as well as an author. He is best known for creating the superhero Marvelman, later known as Miracleman, a character later revived in 1982 in a dark, post-modern reboot by writer Alan Moore, with later contributions by Neil Gaiman.
Lisa Appignanesi  (born 4 January 1946) ; writer, novelist, campaigner for free expression; was Chair of the Royal Society of Literature; former President of English PEN ; Chair of Freud Museum ; chaired 2017 Booker International Prize; Honorary Fellow of St Benet's Hall, Oxford and Visiting Professor in the Department of English at King's College London, and held a Wellcome Trust; has written for The New York Review of Books, The Guardian and The Observer, as well as making programmes and appearing on the BBC; was Director of Talks and Seminars at the Institute of Contemporary Arts (ICA) in London; was made a Chevalier of the Ordre des Arts et des Lettres and was appointed Officer of the Most Excellent Order of the British Empire (OBE) in the 2013 New Year Honours for services to literature. She became a Fellow of the Royal Society of Literature in 2015 and became the Chair of the Royal Society of Literature Council in 2016.
Gilad Atzmon,pro-Palestinian, anti-Israel activist and saxophonist for The Blockheads and Pink Floyd; campaigner, author, writer, prolific blogger and bebop jazz musician of Israeli birth and Ashkenazi origin
David Baddiel (born 28 May 1964); comedian, op-ed writer, broadcaster and author of over ten books, his latest being the critically acclaimed and well received Jews Don't Count, which is about anti-Semitism, double standards against, exclusion of, and racial prejudice against Jews in Britain.
 Ivor Baddiel, brother of David Baddiel, scriptwriter and author. He regularly writes for some of the biggest shows on British television including The BAFTAs (British Academy Film Awards), The X Factor and The National Television Awards. Ivor is also the author of nineteen books for both children and adults.
Sir Michael Balcon(19 May 1896 – 17 October 1977) prolific author and film producer known for leadership of Ealing Studios, one of the most important British film studios; known for his leadership, and his guidance of Alfred Hitchcock;co-founded Gainsborough Pictures, later working with Gaumont British and MGM-British; chairman of the British Film Institute; grandfather of Daniel Day-Lewis.
Zygmunt Bauman (19 November 1925 – 9 January 2017); highly influential Polish Jewish writer, sociologist and philosopher, writing on postmodern consumerism and liquid modernity.
Peter Benenson (born Peter James Henry Solomon; 31 July 1921 – 25 February 2005) British lawyer, writer, pamphleteer, human rights activist and the founder of human rights group Amnesty International (AI); accepted the Pride of Britain Award for Lifetime Achievement in 2001  though he later rejected and denounced Amnesty International for its criticism of Israel. Benenson was the son of British-born Harold Solomon and Russian-born Flora Benenson, grandson of Russian financier Grigori Benenson (1860–1939); served in Intelligence Corps at the Ministry of Information and worked at Bletchley Park during World War II as a cryptographer.
Anya Berger, of Russian Jewish and Austrian Jewish ancestry, actress, wife of John Berger and contributor to Ways of Seeing, translator, intellectual, communist and feminist; cited by The Guardian as having played a part in many of the events and movements that shaped the 20th century.
John Berger, Jewish father, convert to Roman Catholicism, (5 November 1926 – 2 January 2017) was an English art critic, novelist, painter and poet. Berger's essay on art criticism Ways of Seeing, is known as a foundation text employing deconstruction and feminist prisms of epistemology and ontology, questioning axiomatic assumptions about gender, racial prejudice and Orientalism, whilst introducing and debating prisms of Psychological projection, Reification (Marxism), False Consciousness, Commodity fetishism, Marx's theory of alienation  and essentialism. He was a supporter of the Palestinian cause, and, focused on Israel and apartheid, a member of the Support Committee of the Russell Tribunal on Palestine.
J. D. Bernal  (10 May 1901 – 15 September 1971) was an Irish scientist of Sephardi ancestry who pioneered the use of X-ray crystallography in molecular biology, published on the history of science, wrote popular books on science and society; was a communist activist and a member of the Communist Party of Great Britain (CPGB); his book The World, the Flesh and the Devil called "the most brilliant attempt at scientific prediction ever made" by Arthur C. Clarke. It is famous for having been the first to propose the so-called Bernal sphere, a type of space habitat intended for permanent residence. The second chapter explores radical changes to human bodies and intelligence and the third discusses the impact of these on society.
Martin Bernal, author and leading pioneer in the creation of Pan-African studies, of Sephardi ancestry, most famous for his work Black Athena.
Drusilla Beyfus(born 1927) is a British etiquette writer. She was married to the journalist and critic Milton Shulman.
Julie Bindel (born 20 July 1962) is an English radical feminist writer of Roman Catholic and Jewish ancestry.
Lajos Bíró, 22 August 1880 – 9 September 1948, was a Hungarian Jewish author, novelist, playwright, and screenwriter who wrote many films from the early 1920s through the late 1940s.
Anthony Blond (20 March 1928 – 27 February 2008); publisher and author  involved with several publishing companies over his career; of Sephardi ancestry; cousin of Harold Laski.
David Bohm (20 December 1917 – 27 October 1992), American British scientist and prolific author described as one of the most significant theoretical physicists of the 20th century, who contributed unorthodox ideas to quantum theory, neuropsychology and the philosophy of mind, of Hungarian Jewish origin.
Alain de Botton, popular author, broadcaster and YouTube channel entrepreneur, of Ashkenazi and Sephardic ancestry. He co-founded The School of Life. Botton is the son of Gilbert de Botton and descended from a distinguished Sephardic Jewish family; among his ancestors were the rabbinical scholar Abraham de Boton and Yolande Harmer, a  journalist and Israeli intelligence officer. He is also related to Leonard Wolfson, Baron Wolfson,Miel de Botton and Janet Wolfson de Botton,a Trustee of Tate and Chairman of the Council of Tate Modern and appointed Commander of the Most Excellent Order of the British Empire (CBE) in  2006 and elevated to Dame Commander of the Order of the British Empire (DBE) in the 2013 Birthday Honours for charitable services to the arts. 
 Caryl Brahms, writer
Julius Braunthal (1891–1972) was an Austrian Jewish historian, magazine editor, and political activist; Secretary of the Socialist International from 1951 to 1956; wrote three volume History of the International, first published in German between 1961 and 1971.
 David Bret, biographer, broadcaster and chansonnier (French-born; Jewish father)
Jacob Bronowski (18 January 1908 – 22 August 1974) Polish-British mathematician,philosopher, academic and author of more than eighteen scholarly books, focusing on William Blake, magic and evolution; is best known for developing a humanistic approach to science, and as the presenter and writer of the 1973 BBC television documentary series, and accompanying book The Ascent of Man, which led to his regard as "one of the world's most celebrated intellectuals".
Anita Brookner  (16 July 1928 – 10 March 2016); of Polish Jewish ancestry, novelist and art historian; Slade Professor of Fine Art at the University of Cambridge from 1967 to 1968; first woman to hold this visiting professorship; awarded Booker–McConnell Prize for her novel Hotel du Lac.
Rivkah Brown; editor of Vashti Media and Novara Media; critic of the concept of the New antisemitism, critic of Israel and Zionism, writes for The Guardian, Independent, the London Review of Books, The Financial Times and New Statesman.Novara Media (often shortened to Novara) is an independent, left-wing alternative media organisation based in the United Kingdom.
 Elias Canetti, novelist, man of letters, 1981 Nobel Prize (Bulgarian-born); most famous for his work on mass psychology of crowds and anti-fascism, Crowds and Power 
David Cesarani  (13 November 1956 – 25 October 2015) was a British historian who specialised in Jewish history, especially the Holocaust.  He also wrote several biographies, including Arthur Koestler: The Homeless Mind (1998).
 Chapman Cohen, writer on secularism
 Jackie Collins, novelist
Alan Coren(27 June 1938 – 18 October 2007) was an English humourist, writer and satirist who was a regular panellist on the BBC radio quiz The News Quiz and a team captain on BBC television's Call My Bluff. Coren, the author of over twenty books, was also a journalist, and for almost a decade was the editor of Punch magazine. His children, Giles and Victoria, are also writers
 Charlotte Dacre,(1771 or 1772 – 7 November 1825) was an English author of Gothic novels; wrote under the pseudonym "Rosa Matilda" to confuse her critics; her work was admired by some of the literary giants of her day and her novels influenced Percy Bysshe Shelley, who thought highly of her style and creative skills.
Aviva Dautch (born 5 May 1978) poet, academic, curator and magazine publisher,  of Eastern European ancestry; writer in residence at the British Museum, the Jewish Museum London and the Separated Child Foundation and is resident expert on BBC Radio 4's poetry series On Form ; English co-translator for Afghan refugee poet and BBC World Service journalist Suhrab Sirat; has written articles, and curated exhibitions and events for arts organisations including the Bethlem Museum of the Mind, The British Library, The Royal Academy of Arts and Tara Arts;lectures internationally on Jewish arts and culture. In 2020 she was appointed executive director of Jewish Renaissance magazine. Dautch also teaches Jewish Culture and Holocaust Studies at the University of Roehampton and lectures at the London School of Jewish Studies and JW3.
 Lionel Davidson (Hull 1922–2009), thriller novelist, Golden Dagger winner, famous for "The night of Wenceslas", "Chelsea murders", "Kolinsky Heights". Lived briefly in Jaffa, Israel at the invitation of the government.
Isaac Deutscher (3 April 1907 – 19 August 1967); Polish Jewish Marxist author, journalist and political activist who moved to the United Kingdom before the outbreak of World War II; best known as a biographer of Leon Trotsky and as a commentator on Marxist dialectic and Soviet affairs. His three-volume biography of Trotsky was highly influential among the British New Left in the 1960s and 1970s.
Jenny Diski, countercultural protagonist, author and contributor to the UK Underground press, colleague of R.D. Laing, notable for starting the Freightliners free school.
 Benjamin Disraeli (1804–1881), novelist, poet, playwright, writer, and prime minister
 Isaac D'Israeli, writer
Michael Pinto-Duschinsky (born June 1943) is a Hungarian-born author,journalist, scholar, political consultant and writer.
Anton Ehrenzweig (27 November 1908 – 5 December 1966) was an Austrian Jewish British author and theorist on modern art, psychoanalysis and Avant-garde music who wroteThe Psychoanalysis of Artistic Vision and Hearing (1953) and The Hidden Order of Art (1967). 
Norbert Elias (22 June 1897 – 1 August 1990) was a German Jewish sociologist who later became a British citizen; author of The Civilizing Process and especially famous for his theory of civilizing/decivilizing processes.
 Richard Ellmann, literary scholar and biographer
Aaron Esterson (23 September 1923 –15 April 1999) prolific author and psychiatrist who was one of the founders of the Philadelphia Association along with R. D. Laing, with whom he wrote Sanity, Madness, and the Family. He wrote four other scholarly texts on psychiatry and existentialism as well as countless academic papers and monographs. 
 Moris Farhi, writer (Turkish-born)
 Benjamin Farjeon
Eleanor Farjeon (13 February 1881 – 5 June 1965) was an English author of children's stories and plays, poetry, biography, history and satire. Several of her works had illustrations by Edward Ardizzone. Her most famous work was Morning Has Broken, a Christian hymn first published in 1931.
Mick Farren,(3 September 1943 – 27 July 2013)Proto-punk musician, anarchist, political activist, anti-fascist agent provocateur and author; foundation figure in the growth of the British Underground press; co-wrote songs with Lemmy Kilmister for Hawkwind and Motorhead was an English rock musician, singer, journalist, and author associated with counterculture and the UK underground. Farren was prolific writer for the International Times and New Musical Express, as well as writing 23 novels and eleven works of non-fiction and was columnist for Los Angeles CityBeat.
Andrew Feinstein author of The Shadow World: Inside the Global Arms Trade, an investigation into the global arms industry; The Washington Post described the book as "A comprehensive treatment of the arms trade, possibly the most complete account ever written." A staunch critic of the nature and regulation of the global arms trade, Feinstein is a board member of Declassified UK, an investigative journalism website set up in 2019 by Matt Kennard and Mark Curtis to cover the UK's role on the international stage. 
David Feldman (historian) author and professor at Birkbeck College, University of London; director of the Pears Institute for the study of Antisemitism;  Pears Institute for the Study of Antisemitism was launched in 2010, as a centre for research, teaching, and public policy formation relating to antisemitism and racial intolerance. research relates to the history of minorities and their place in British society from 1600 to the current time.
 Gilbert Frankau, writer
Pamela Frankau (3 January 1908 – 8 June 1967) popular novelist from a prominent artistic and literary family who wrote over thirty novels; grandmother was novelist Julia Frankau; father was Gilbert Frankau; partner was Italian-Jewish poet Humbert Wolfe.
Gillian Freeman (1929–2019), novelist and screenwriter; best known for her screenplays for The Leather Boys, I Want What I Want (film) and Only Lovers Left Alive (novel)
Hadley Freeman (born 15 May 1978) American British journalist based in London; writes for the Jewish Chronicle, The Guardian and Vogue; of Austro-Hungarian and Polish Jewish ancestry.
 Stephen Fry, actor and writer
 Neil Gaiman, fantasy writer
Uri Geller; ; born 20 December 1946 in British Mandate of Palestine Mandatory Palestine (now Israel), of Hungarian Jewish ancestry, is an Israeli-British illusionist, magician, television personality, self-proclaimed psychic and author of over ten books, both fiction and non-fiction.
Ernest Gellner, social anthropologist, scholar of nationalism and identity, of Austrian Jewish and Czech Jewish origin.
Morris Ginsberg FBA (14 May 1889 – 31 August 1970) was a British sociologist and prolific author who played a key role in the development of the discipline of sociology. He served as editor of The Sociological Review in the 1930s and later became the founding chairman of the British Sociological Association in 1951 and its first President (1955–1957). He was president of the Aristotelian Society from 1942 to 1943, and helped draft the UNESCO 1950 statement titled The Race Question.
Maurice Glasman, Baron Glasman (born 8 March 1961); prolific author, political theorist, academic, social commentator, and Labour life peer in the House of Lords; senior lecturer in Political Theory at London Metropolitan University and Director of its Faith and Citizenship Programme; best known as a founder of Blue Labour, a term he coined in 2009;called on the Labour Party to establish dialogue with the far-right English Defence League (EDL) in order to challenge their views; called for some immigration to be temporarily halted and for the right of free movement of labour, a key provision of the Treaty of Rome, to be abrogated, dividing opinion among Labour commentators.; accepted the visiting professorship he was offered by Haifa University, telling The Jewish Chronicle: "If people I know say they want to boycott Israel, I say they should start by boycotting me". At the 2016 Limmud conference, he suggested the Labour Party's antisemitism harked back to Jewish Marxists, who wanted to "liberate Jews" from their Judaism.
 Ralph Glasser, wrote Growing up in the Gorbals
 Louis Golding, novelist
Vivien Goldman is a British author and academic of German Jewish ancestry, focusing on the historiography, Praxis (process), dialectic and epistemology of punk rock, dub, and reggae.
 Lewis Goldsmith, journalist and political writer
Ernst Gombrich, art historian of Viennese Jewish origin.
Richard Gombrich, writer of Viennese Jewish ancestry, British Indologist and scholar of Sanskrit, Pāli, and Buddhist studies; historian of Tripiṭaka, Sthavira nikāya, Mahāsāṃghika schools, Abhidharma, Vinaya, Theravada,and ancient collections of Buddhist texts
David Graeber, British-American author, academic, scholar and anti capitalist anarchist activist, writer of Ashkenazi origin.
 Linda Grant, novelist
 Dominic Green, historian and journalist
Tony Greenstein, anti fascist, anti-Zionist writer and pro-Palestinian author, activist of Polish Jewish rabbinical lineage and ancestry; author of The Fight Against Fascism in Brighton & the South Coast and Zionism: Antisemitism’s twin in Jewish garb.
 Charlotte Haldane, feminist writer
Keith Kahn-Harris; author, sociologist and music critic; honorary research fellow and senior lecturer at Birkbeck College and an associate fellow of the Institute for Jewish Policy Research and a lecturer at Leo Baeck College; has published academic and non-academic articles on Judaism, music scenes, heavy metal music, transgression, Israel, communities, dialogue, religion, ethnicity, political discourse, and denial; also writes for Medium, The Guardian, The Independent, Times of Israel, Haaretz, The Herald (Scotland), New Statesman, Times Higher Education (THE), The i Paper, openDemocracy; from 2001–02 was "Jerusalem Fellow" at the Mandel School for Advanced Educational Leadership in Jerusalem.
Simon Hattenstone (born 29 December 1962 in Salford, England); journalist and writer; features writer and interviewer for The Guardian. He has also written or ghost-written a number of biographical books.
Margot Heinemann (18 November 1913 – 10 June 1992) was a British Marxist writer, drama scholar, and leading member of the Communist Party of Great Britain (CPGB).
 Basil Henriques
 Muriel Gray, author, The Tube presenter
 Zoë Heller, author (Jewish father), daughter of screenwriter Lukas Heller; her paternal grandfather was the political philosopher Hermann Heller. Her brother is screenwriter Bruno Heller. Her sister, Lucy Heller, is Chief Executive of education charity Ark
 Noreena Hertz, (born 24 September 1967) author, hosted "MegaHertz: London Calling," on Sirius XM's Insight channel and ITV News Economics Editor; wife of Danny Cohen (television executive), who previously held posts as Director of BBC Television and Controller of BBC One; from 1996 to 1997 she worked on the Middle East peace process with Palestinians, Egyptians, Israelis and Jordanians; honorary professor at University College London; Guardian op-ed writer. great-granddaughter of Joseph Hertz (Chief Rabbi of the British Empire)
David Hirsh (born 29 September 1967); pro-Zionist, pro-Israeli author and scholar; senior Lecturer in Sociology at Goldsmiths, University of London, and co-founder of Engage, a campaign against the academic boycott of Israel; helped develop the Euston Manifesto.
Eric Hobsbawm, Marxist historian of Viennese Jewish origin.
 Anthony Horowitz, works include the Alex Rider series
 Eva Ibbotson, known for her award-winning children's books and for her romance novels
Jeremy Isaacs (born 28 September 1932), author of four books; creator of The World at War, British documentary television series chronicling the events of the Second World War, recipient of many British Academy Television Awards and International Emmy Awards; won the British Film Institute Fellowship in 1986, the International Emmy Directorate Award in 1987 and the BAFTA Fellowship in 1985, General Director of the Royal Opera House, Covent Garden from 1987 to 1996; was the founding chief executive of Channel 4 between 1981 and 1987.
 Joseph Jacobs, folklorist
Howard Jacobson (born 1942), author; has described himself as "a Jewish Jane Austen" (in response to being described as "the English Philip Roth"), and also states, "I'm not by any means conventionally Jewish. I don't go to shul. What I feel is that I have a Jewish mind, I have a Jewish intelligence. I feel linked to previous Jewish minds of the past. I don't know what kind of trouble this gets somebody into, a disputatious mind. What a Jew is has been made by the experience of 5,000 years, that's what shapes the Jewish sense of humour, that's what shaped Jewish pugnacity or tenaciousness." He maintains that "comedy is a very important part of what I do." Jacobson expressed concern over antisemitism in the Labour Party under Jeremy Corbyn's leadership, with particular reference to a growth in Anti-Zionism and its "antisemitic characteristics" which were "a taint of international and historic shame" and that trust between the party and most British Jews was "fractured beyond repair".
 Ruth Prawer Jhabvala, novelist and screenwriter
 Gabriel Josipovici, novelist and short story writer
Ben Judah(born 1988) is a British journalist and the author of This Is London and Fragile Empire;son of author Tim Judah; of Baghdadi Jewish descent; was a policy fellow in London at the European Council on Foreign Relations; has also been a visiting fellow at the European Stability Initiative in Istanbul; was a research fellow at the Hudson Institute in Washington D.C. In 2020, he joined the Atlantic Council in Washington D.C. as a Nonresident Senior Fellow. Judah has written for various progressive and conservative think-tanks including The Center For American Progress (CAP) and Policy Exchange.
Tim Judah(born 31 March 1962) is a British writer of Iraqi Jewish ancestry, reporter and political analyst for The Economist. Judah has written several books on the geopolitics of the Balkans, mainly focusing on Serbia and Kosovo.
Tony Judt  (2 January 1948 – 6 August 2010) was a British-American historian, essayist and university professor of Russian Jewish and Romanian Jewish ancestry, who specialised in European history;in aftermath of the Six-Day War, Judt worked as a driver and translator for the Israel Defense Forces. After the war, Judt's belief in the Zionist enterprise began to unravel and he then called for the conversion of "Israel from a Jewish state to a binational one" that would include all of what is now Israel, Gaza, East Jerusalem, and the West Bank. This proposed new state would have equal rights for all Jews and Arabs living in Israel and the Palestinian territories.
Anthony Julius (born 16 July 1956)  author of Trials of the Diaspora: A History of Anti-Semitism in England   focusing on tendency in English history that is discriminatory against Jews, arguing that current anti-Zionism in England developed out of antisemitism in the United Kingdom and utilises the same antisemitic tropes in its arguments; was chairman of the board of The Jewish Chronicle; founder of The Euston Manifesto and was founding member of Engage (organisation) which aims to counter the boycott Israel campaign; known for being Diana, Princess of Wales divorce lawyer and for representing Deborah Lipstadt in trial against David Irving.

Authors, K-Z 
Oliver Kamm (born 1963); journalist and writer who is a leader writer and columnist for The Times; The Jewish Chronicle, Prospect magazine, and The Guardian; signatory to the Euston Manifesto; writes on the theory of the New antisemitism, anti-Zionism and the argument that there is anti Semitism in the British Labour Party.
John Kampfner, author, broadcaster and commentator; executive director at Chatham House; has written and presented for Reuters, The Daily Telegraph; chief political correspondent at the Financial Times; political commentator for BBC's Today radio programme; political correspondent on Newsnight; was chair of the Clore Duffield Foundation, Council of King's College London; Chief Executive of the freedom of expression organisation Index on Censorship and established  Creative Industries Federation; shortlisted for the Orwell Book prize. 
Adam Kay (writer) (born 12 June 1980) comedy writer, author, comedian and former doctor. His television writing credits include Crims, Mrs. Brown's Boys and Mitchell and Webb. He is best known as author of the number-one bestselling book This Is Going to Hurt.
Hans Keller (11 March 1919 – 6 November 1985) was a Viennese Jewish British musician and prolific writer, who made significant contributions to musicology and music criticism; best known for his appearance on TV show The Look of the Week in which he interviewed Syd Barrett and Roger Waters. Keller was generally puzzled by, or even contemptuous of, the group and its music, opening with the comment "why has it all got to be so terribly loud?" 
 Judith Kerr, children's writer
 Gerald Kersh, novelist
Sophia King (later Fortnum; b. 1781/2, d. in or after 1805) Gothic novelist and poet
Jacky Klein (born 28 January 1977)  art historian, broadcaster, author; co-presented Britain's Lost Masterpieces for BBC4; co-authored book with sister, Suzy Klein,  What is Contemporary Art? A Children's Guide, commissioned by the Museum of Modern Art, New York, published by Thames & Hudson; has also authored works on Wyndham Lewis and Grayson Perry; in 2015, was Executive Editor at Tate Publishing    
Suzy Klein (born 1 April 1975) author and radio and television presenter; Head of Arts and Classical Music TV for the BBC; winner of William Hardcastle Award for Journalism; was assistant producer at BBC Radio 4 on programmes including Start the Week ; then moved to BBC Television, working as director and producer on arts and music films. In 2008, she presented the Proms season on BBC Two; has also presented  The Culture Show, BBC Young Musician of the Year and The Review Show; For Sky Arts, hosted programmes on Sky Arts 2; also presented Aida from Royal Albert Hall (March 2012) for  The Rosenblatt Recitals ; was named Music Broadcaster of the Year, winning the Silver Prize at the Sony Awards; has presented global opera broadcasts for Royal Opera, London, and hosted broadcasts of the Royal Shakespeare Company; in 2021, appointed Head of Arts and Classical Music TV.
 Matthew Kneale, writer (Jewish mother)
Matthew Kramer  (born 9 June 1959) author and editor of over twenty scholarly texts; philosopher and signatory of the Euston Manifesto; currently Professor of Legal and Political Philosophy at the University of Cambridge and a Fellow of Churchill College, Cambridge. He writes mainly in the areas of metaethics, normative ethics, legal philosophy, and political philosophy; Director of the Cambridge Forum for Legal and Political Philosophy; elected a Fellow of the British Academy, the United Kingdom's national academy for the humanities and social sciences.
Nick Lowles, founder of Hope Not Hate and former editor of the anti-fascist Searchlight (magazine), backed by various politicians and celebrities several trade unions. Knowles is the author of a number of books on football violence, right wing groups and anti-Semitism in Britain.He was an freelance investigative journalist, working in television, including on BBC Panorama, World in Action, Channel Four Dispatches and MacIntyre Undercover.
 Arthur Koestler, novelist and critic
 Bernard Kops, poet
Peter Kosminsky (born 21 April 1956) is a British writer, director,screenwriter and producer; has directed Hollywood movies such as White Oleander and television films like Warriors, The Government Inspector, The Promise, Wolf Hall and The State.
Shalom Lappin, leading scholar, journalist (for The Guardian), academic, and author of over ten books in the field of Computational Linguistics; signatory of the Euston Manifesto; writes on the New Anti-Semitism and anti-Zionism as anti-Semitism in Britain; elected a Fellow of the British Academy (FBA).
Marghanita Laski (24 October 1915 – 6 February 1988); journalist, BBC radio panellist and novelist; also wrote literary biography, plays and short stories, and contributed about 250,000 additions to the Oxford English Dictionary; was science fiction critic for The Observer; was member of the Annan Committee on broadcasting between 1974 and 1977; joined Arts Council and was elected Vice Chair and served as the Chair of the Literature Panel. Her play, The Offshore Island, is about nuclear warfare.
 Sir Sidney Lee (1859–1926), biographer and literary scholar
 Joseph Leftwich, writer, one of the Whitechapel Boys
Antony Lerman (born 11 March 1946); author advocating One-state solution in Israel and Palestine; critic of the concept of the New antisemitism; explores meaning of Zionism and Anti-Zionism; from 2006 to early 2009, was Director of the Institute for Jewish Policy Research. 
 David Levi, writer on Jewish subjects
 Amy Levy (1861–1889), poet, novelist, short story writer, essayist
 Gertrude Rachel Levy, writer and cultural historian 
 Paul Levy, food writer, biographer; long rabbinical pedigree
Bernard Lewis,  (31 May 1916 – 19 May 2018);  specialised in Oriental studies; public intellectual and political commentator; wrote over ten books on  history of Islam and the interaction between Islam and the West; was called "the West's leading interpreter of the Middle East". Others have accused Lewis of having revived the image of cultural inferiority of Islam and of emphasising the dangers of jihad. His advice was frequently sought by neoconservative policymakers, including the Bush administration. However, his active support of the Iraq War and neoconservative ideals have since come under scrutiny.
David Littman (activist) (4 July 1933 – 20 May 2012) author of over five books and scores of monographs and academic papers and activist best known for organising the departure of Jewish children from Morocco; then worked as lobbyist at the United Nations in Geneva and was also historian. He was married to Bat Ye'or.
 Emanuel Litvinoff, novelist.(5 May 1915 – 24 September 2011) was a British writer and well-known figure in Anglo-Jewish literature, known for novels, short stories, poetry, plays and human rights campaigning. Litvinoff became aware of plight of persecuted Soviet Jews, and started worldwide campaign against this persecution. Due to Litvinoff's efforts, prominent Jewish groups in United States became aware of issue, and well-being of Soviet Jews became cause for a worldwide campaign, eventually leading to mass migration of Jews from the Soviet Union to Israel and the United States. For this he has been described by Meir Rosenne, former Israeli ambassador to the United States, as "one of the greatest unsung heroes of the twentieth century... who won in the fight against an evil empire" and that "thousands and thousands of Russian Jews owe him their freedom".
Moshé Machover (Hebrew: משה מחובר; born 1936) is a mathematician, philosopher, pro Palestinian socialist anti fascist activist and author, noted for his writings critical of Israel and against Zionism.
David Magarshack (23 December 1899 – 26 October 1977); author, translator and biographer of Russian authors, best remembered for his translations of Dostoevsky, Chekhov and Nikolai Gogol; of Russian Jewish ancestry.
 Leo Marks, cryptographer and screenwriter
Madeleine Masson Rayner (née Levy; 23 April 1912 – 23 August 2007), author of plays, film scripts, novels, memoirs and biographies; best known for her biography of the highly respected and decorated war heroine, Polish agent of the British Special Operations Executive, Krystyna Skarbek.
 Anna Maxted, writer, journalist
Gerard Menuhin, son of Yehudi Menuhin
 George Mikes, Hungarian-born comic writer
Ralph Miliband (born Adolphe Miliband; 7 January 1924 – 21 May 1994) sociologist and Marxist author of Polish Jewish ancestry; father of Ed Miliband and David Miliband, described as "one of the best known academic Marxists of his generation", on a par with E. P. Thompson, Eric Hobsbawm and Perry Anderson.
 Santa Montefiore, author (convert)
 Simon Sebag Montefiore, author and Haaretz journalist;Jerusalem: The Biography was a number one non-fiction Sunday Times bestseller and a global bestseller and won The Jewish Book of the Year Award from the Jewish Book Council. 
Benny Morris (born 8 December 1948) Israeli historian of British Jewish ancestry;member of the group of Israeli historians known as the "New Historians," a term Morris coined to describe himself and historians Avi Shlaim, Ilan Pappé and Simha Flapan; Morris's work on the Arab–Israeli conflict and especially the Israeli–Palestinian conflict has won praise and criticism from both sides of the political divide. Morris regards himself as a Zionist.
Saul Newman, anarchist scholar and activist,(born 22 March 1972) is a British political theorist who writes on post-anarchism. He is professor of political theory at Goldsmiths College, University of London.
Yotam Ottolenghi (born 14 December 1968),Israeli-British celebrity chef; journalist for The Guardian and Haaretz; author of several cookery books, including Ottolenghi: The Cookbook (2008), Plenty (2010), Jerusalem (2012). Moved to Europe after his service in Military Intelligence Directorate (Israel); in 2014,London Evening Standard remarked that Ottolenghi had "radically rewritten the way Londoners cook and eat"; in 2017 was guest judge on Masterchef Australia.
Ilan Pappé,  pro-Palestinian dissident Israeli-British scholar, writer and author of Ashkenazi origin, focusing on the history of Palestinian Nakba, intifada, insurgency, land ownership and rights and radical Anti-Zionism.
 Joseph Pardo (c. 1624 – 1677), hazzan and writer
Adam Phillips (psychologist)(born 19 September 1954) is a British psychoanalytic  psychotherapist, essayist and author of well over twenty books,scholarly articles and academic papers; since 2003 he has been the general editor of the new Penguin Modern Classics translations of Sigmund Freud and is a regular contributor to the London Review of Books.
 Alexander Piatigorsky, writer, philosopher, culture theorist; winner of the 2002 Russian Bely Prize for literature
 Harold Pinter, writer, playwright
Michael Polanyi  (11 March 1891 – 22 February 1976) was a Hungarian-British polymath and author, who made important theoretical contributions to physical chemistry, economics, and philosophy.
Robert Popper (born 23 November 1967); comedy producer, script writer, actor, and satirical author; writing credits include South Park, The Comic Strip, the Channel 4 show,The Big Breakfast,Bo' Selecta!, Black Books, Spaced and Bremner, Bird and Fortune
 Frederic Raphael, screenwriter, novelist and critic
Dave Rich is Head of Policy at the Community Security Trust writes on what is perceived to be British left-wing antisemitism. He is an associate research fellow at the Pears Institute for the Study of Antisemitism. Rich has written a book, published in 2016,  The Left's Jewish Problem: Jeremy Corbyn, Israel and Anti‑Semitism  which began as his doctoral dissertation.
John Rodker (18 December 1894 – 6 October 1955) was an English writer, modernist poet, and publisher of modernist writers and one of the "Whitechapel Boys", a group including Isaac Rosenberg, Mark Gertler, David Bomberg, Samuel Weinstein and Joseph Lefkowitz 
Adele Rose (8 December 1933 – 28 December 2020) was an English television writer. She was the longest-serving scriptwriter for the soap opera Coronation Street, writing 457 scripts over a period of 37 years from 1961, and was the first woman to write for the show. She also originated the series Byker Grove (1989–2006), aimed at teenagers.
Hilary Rose (sociologist) (born 1935) is a British sociologist and author of over ten books and more than 150 scholarly articles and papers; critic of Israel, Zionism and the continued settlement, colonisation and occupation of Palestinian land,calling for Academic boycott of Israel .
Nikolas Rose is a British sociologist and social theorist.  He is Distinguished Honorary Professor at the Research School of Social Sciences, in the College of Arts and Social Sciences at the Australian National University and Honorary Professor at the Institute of Advanced Studies at University College London.
Steven Rose (born 4 July 1938) neuroscientist, prolific author, social commentator; instrumental in calling for Academic boycott of Israel as long as Israel continues its occupation of the Palestinian Territories, on grounds of Israeli academics' close relationship with Israel Defense Forces; founding members of British Committee for the Universities of Palestine;regular panellist on BBC Radio 4's ethics debating series The Moral Maze. 
Michael Rosen (born 7 May 1946), novelist, poet and broadcaster
Hannah Mary Rothschild  (born 22 May 1962), daughter of Jacob Rothschild, 4th Baron Rothschild, author, businesswoman, philanthropist and documentary filmmaker, has written screenplays and journalism, a biography and two novels; serves on charitable and financial boards and is first female to chair the Board of Trustees of the National Gallery in London;liaison trustee for the Tate Gallery;trustee of the Whitechapel Gallery;chair of Yad Hanadiv in Israel; directed films for Saturday Review, Arena and Omnibus; has written forThe Times, The New York Times, The Observer, The Guardian, Daily Telegraph, Vanity Fair, Vogue, The Spectator and Harper's Bazaar, Financial Times, Elle,  Washington Post and others.
 Bernice Rubens, novelist
Oliver Sacks  (9 July 1933 – 30 August 2015), neurologist, naturalist, historian of science, and writer of over twenty books, screenplays and scholarly articles, amongst them, 1973 book Awakenings, which was adapted into an Academy Award-nominated feature film in 1990, starring Robin Williams and Robert De Niro.
 Nina Salaman, poet and translator
Raphael Samuel (26 December 19349 December 1996) Marxist; prolific author and historian of Hungarian Jewish ancestry, described by Stuart Hall as "one of the most outstanding, original intellectuals of his generation"; member of Communist Party Historians Group, alongside Christopher Hill, E.P. Thompson; founded the Partisan Coffee House in 1956 in Soho, London, as a meeting place for British New Left.
Philippe Sands, KC (born 17 October 1960), writer, journalist and lawyer 11 King's Bench Walk; Director of the Centre on International Courts and Tribunals ; counsel and advocate before many international courts and tribunals, including the International Court of Justice, the International Tribunal for the Law of the Sea, the European Court of Justice, the European Court of Human Rights and International Criminal Court;serves on panel of International Centre for the Settlement of Investment Disputes (CAS).; is  author of seventeen books on international law as well as writing a number of geo-political texts; served as President of English PEN; appointed Professor of Law at Harvard Law School; co-founder of the Centre for International Environmental Law ; and the Project on International Courts and Tribunals (1997); served as a Commissioner on the UK Government Commission on a Bill of Human Rights.
George Sassoon,(30 October 1936 – 8 March 2006) was a British scientist, electronic engineer, linguist, translator and science fiction author of Iraqi Jewish Mizrahi Jewish origin;  author of The Manna-Machine (1978) and The Kabbalah Decoded (1978).
Siegfried Sassoon, writer and WW1 poet, of Iraqi Jewish Mizrahi Jewish origin.
Charles Saatchi (born 9 June 1943); author of numerous books, periodicals, journals and monographs on art and culture, Mizrahi Jewish Iraqi-Jewish British businessman and co-founder, with brother Maurice, of advertising agency Saatchi & Saatchi, the world's largest advertising agency; later formed a new agency called M&C Saatchi; also known for his art collection and for owning Saatchi Gallery, and for sponsorship of the Young British Artists (YBAs), including Damien Hirst and Tracey Emin.Successful campaigns included Silk Cut's advertisements and those for Conservative Party's 1979 general election victory – led by Margaret Thatcher through the slogan "Labour Isn't Working". Other clients included British Airways. In the Sunday Times Rich List 2009 ranking of the wealthiest people in the UK, was grouped with brother Maurice, with estimated  fortune of £120 million.
Simon Schama  (born 13 February 1945), author of Lithuanian Jewish ancestry, specialising in art history, Dutch history, Jewish history, and French history. He is a University Professor of History and Art History at Columbia University, New York.
 Will Self, novelist (Jewish mother); son of Peter Self, and grandson of Sir Albert Henry Self 
Nicholas Serota,  (born 27 April 1946), author, art historian and curator; served as Director of the Tate from 1988 to 2017; currently Chair of Arts Council England; was previously Director of The Museum of Modern Art, Oxford, and Director of the Whitechapel Gallery,  before becoming Director of the Tate; was also Chairman of the Turner Prize jury .
Colin Shindler; first professor of Israel Studies in the UK; founding chairman of the European Association of Israeli Studies (EAIS); author of ten books including History Of Modern Israel(Cambridge University Press); main interests lie in evolution of Israeli Right, changes in the approach of the British and European Left towards Israel since 1948 and emigration movement of Soviet Jews between 1917 and 1991; Israel and the European Left: Between Solidarity and Delegitimisation (Continuum/Bloomsbury) was one of first books to examine  history of relationship between the British Left and Israel; also wrote Vladimir Jabotinsky, Menahem Begin and Avraham Stern, The Rise of the Israeli Right: From Odessa to Hebron (Cambridge University Press) which was awarded gold medal in The Washington Institute’s for Near East Policy’s Book Prize competition; writes for the Jewish Chronicle, Jerusalem Post, Haaretz, History Today, Times Literary Supplement ; author of over 650 articles and reviews on Israel and Jewish political history.
Avi Shlaim, writer, of Iraqi Jewish and Mizrahi Jewish  origin; his work focuses on Zionist settlement of the land of Palestine, history of the Nakba and dispossession of Palestinian land. He is one of Israel's New Historians, a group of Israeli scholars who put forward critical interpretations of the history of Zionism and Israel.
Nicola Shulman (born 1960), is a British biographer, former model, and aristocrat. After her marriage in 1990 she has been known as Nicola Phipps, Marchioness of Normanby. She is the author of two biographies. Her second book, Graven with Diamonds, was reviewed in The Daily Telegraph, The Guardian, The Times, The Sunday Times,  and The Independent.
 J. David Simons, novelist
Robert Skidelsky, Baron Skidelsky  (born 25 April 1939) , of Russian Jewish ancestry, author of fifteen academic texts on economics and politics, focusing on, amongst others, fascist Oswald Mosley and he is the author of a three-volume award-winning biography of British economist John Maynard Keynes (1883–1946). Skidelsky also writes for  The Guardian, The New York Times, Daily Mail, Financial Times.
Flora Solomon, OBE (née Benenson; 28 September 1895 – 18 July 1984) was an influential Zionist. The first woman hired to improve working conditions at Marks & Spencer in London, Solomon was later instrumental in the exposure of the spy Kim Philby. She was the mother of Peter Benenson, founder of Amnesty International and founder of Blackmore Press, a British printing house. Her life was described in her autobiography A Woman's Way, written in collaboration with Barnet Litvinoff and published in 1984 by Simon & Schuster. The work was also  titled Baku to Baker Street: The Memoirs of Flora Solomon.  Solomon campaigned for subsidised medical services, directly influencing the Labour concept of the welfare state and the creation of the British National Health Service in 1948
 Muriel Spark, novelist (Jewish father, possible Jewish mother; converted to Catholicism later in life)
Bob Stanley (born Robert Andrew Shukman; 25 December 1964); musician, journalist, author, film producer; member of indie pop group Saint Etienne and music journalist for NME, Melody Maker, Mojo, The Guardian and The Times, as well as writing three books on music and football; also has a career as a DJ and as a producer of record labels, and has collaborated on a series of films about London. His second publication, Yeah! Yeah! Yeah!: The Story of Modern Pop, published by Faber & Faber; third publication Let's Do It: The Birth of Pop Music: A History, published by Pegasus. 
Hillel Steiner  (born 1942) is a prolific author, scholar, academic, editor and political philosopher and is Emeritus Professor of Political Philosophy at the University of Manchester; signatory to the Euston Manifesto and elected to the Fellowship of the British Academy in 1999. He is a member of the following organisations: American Philosophical Association, Aristotelian Society, International Association for the Philosophy of Law and Social Philosophy, Basic Income Earth Network. British Philosophical Association, European Society for the History of Economic Thought, Political Studies Association, Society for Applied Philosophy, and the September Group.
 William Sutcliffe, novelist; New Boy (1986), Are You Experienced? (1997), Whatever Makes You Happy (2008), and The Wall (2013), set in an Israeli colony
David Sylvester CBE (21 September 1924 – 19 June 2001); prolific author, art critic, journalist and curator; trustee of the Tate Gallery; influential in promoting modern artists Francis Bacon, Joan Miró, and Lucian Freud; father of modern artist Cecily Brown ; credited with coining the term Kitchen sink realism originally to describe a strand of post-war British painting.
 Mitchell Symons, writer
Henri Tajfel (born Hersz Mordche; 22 June 1919 – 3 May 1982) was a Polish Jewish social psychologist and author, best known for his books and pioneering work on the cognitive aspects of prejudice and social identity theory, as well as being one of the founders of the European Association of Experimental Social Psychology. He also worked for the United Nations International Refugee Organisation.
 Adam Thirlwell, novelist
Jackie Walker (activist), anti Zionist playwright, pro-Palestinian, anti fascist author, of Sephardi Jewish and Jamaican origin.
Arthur Waley (1889–1966); orientalist and sinologist of Ashkenazi ancestry; renowned for his translations of Chinese and Japanese poetry; awarded the CBE in 1952, the Queen's Gold Medal for Poetry; invested as a Companion of Honour in 1956.
Yair Wallach is an Israeli British historian, researcher and writer; lecturer at SOAS University of London; teaches Israeli Studies; originally from Jerusalem, his writing and academic work centers on contested nature of modernity in Israel and on Palestinian land; research associate at the University of Cambridge, in the ESRC research programme "Conflict in Cities", where he studies the possibilities and meanings of "shared space" in Jerusalem and other contested cities.
Fredric Warburg (27 November 1898 – 25 May 1981), author, publicist, publisher best known for association with George Orwell. Besides his own work as an author, he promoted and published Franz Kafka. Other notable publications included The Third Eye by Lobsang Rampa, Adolf Hitler's Mein Kampf and William Shirer's The Rise and Fall of the Third Reich.
Ruby Wax  (born 19 April 1953) is an American-British actress, author of popular self-help books, comedian, television personality, and popular mental health campaigner, of Austrian Jewish descent; appointed Chancellor of the University of Southampton; Wax also teaches business communication in the public and private sectors. Clients include Deutsche Bank, the UK Home Office and Skype.
Eyal Weizman MBE FBA  (born 1970) is a British Israeli architect and author of over twenty books and academic papers, mostly on the Israeli occupation of Palestinian land and the architecture of the wall around Gaza. He is the director of the research agency Forensic Architecture at Goldsmiths, University of London where he is Professor of Spatial and Visual Cultures and a founding director there of the Centre for Research Architecture at the department of Visual Cultures. In 2019 he was elected Fellow of the British Academy.
Rosie Whitehouse, journalist and author. Wife of Tim Judah and mother of Ben Judah; of Iraqi Jewish ancestry. Her historical research and profiles of Holocaust Survivors have been published by The Observer, The Jewish Chronicle, BBC News and Tablet magazine. Meanwhile, her writing about British government policy toward victims after the Holocaust and contemporary British antisemitism has appeared in The Independent and Haaretz.
 Stephen Winsten, writer
Robert Winston, Baron Winston,  (born 15 July 1940) is a British professor, author, journalist, medical doctor, scientist, television presenter and Labour Party politician.He is a member of Labour Friends of Israel; father of Ben Winston,renowned for producing a number of the annual Brit Awards from 2011 to 2014 and more recently he was a co-producer of US Grammy Awards and Tony Awards.
 Leonard Woolf, writer and activist
Bat Ye'or(born1933), best known for creating and popularising Eurabia conspiracy theory in her writings about modern Europe.
Israel Zangwill (1864–1926), novelist and playwright. Zangwill was a British author at the forefront of cultural Zionism during the 19th century, and was associate of Theodor Herzl, later rejecting search for a Jewish homeland in Palestine. Father of Oliver Zangwill and husband of Suffragette Edith Ayrton.
 Theodore Zeldin, writer

Poets

 Dannie Abse, poet and physician
 Al Alvarez, poet
 Ivor Cutler, poet, humorist, musician
Aviva Dautch, poet
 Elaine Feinstein, poet, writer, biographer
 Rose Fyleman, children's writer
 Karen Gershon, German-born poet
 Philip Hobsbaum, poet
 Jenny Joseph, poet
 Amy Levy, poet and novelist
 Michael Hamburger OBE poet and translator
 Vivian de Sola Pinto, poet
 John Rodker, poet and publisher
 Isaac Rosenberg, war poet
Siegfried Sassoon, writer and WW1 poet, of Iraqi Jewish Mizrahi Jewish origin.
Henry Shukman (born 1962 in Oxford, Oxfordshire); poet and writer; father was historian Harold Shukman; brother is BBC News reporter David Shukman. 
 Jon Silkin, poet
Stephen Spender  (28 February 1909 – 16 July 1995); poet, novelist and essayist whose work concentrated on themes of social injustice and the class struggle; son of Harold Spender (22 June 1864 – 15 April 1926), Liberal Party politician, author, journalist and lecturer of German Jewish ancestry.
George Szirtes (born 29 November 1948);  poet and translator; opposes Boycott, Divestment and Sanctions movement and was a signatory to the Euston Manifesto; was  judge for the 2017 Griffin Poetry Prize; has won a variety of prizes for his work, most recently the 2004 T. S. Eliot Prize, for his collection Reel, and the Bess Hokin Prize in 2008 for poems in Poetry magazine. His translations from Hungarian poetry, fiction and drama have also won numerous awards; has received an Honorary Fellowhsip from Goldsmiths College, University of London
Arthur Waley (born Arthur David Schloss, 19 August 188927 June 1966); produced works on Theravada Tripiṭaka Sutta Piṭaka and Abhidhamma Piṭaka texts, as well as developing translations of works by Chuang Tzu, Lao Tzu, and writing his own perspectives and contemplations on the key Mahayana wisdom scriptures. Amongst his honours were the CBE in 1952, the Queen's Gold Medal for Poetry in 1953, and he was invested as a Companion of Honour in 1956.
 Humbert Wolfe, poet and civil servant

Playwrights

 Peter Barnes, playwright
 Steven Berkoff, playwright, actor, author, and theatre director 
Ben Elton (born 3 May 1959) comedian, actor, author, playwright, lyricist and director; was a part of London's alternative comedy movement of the 1980s and writer on the sitcoms The Young Ones and Blackadder, as well as stand-up comedian on stage and television; style in the 1980s was left-wing political satire; Elton is cousin of singer Olivia Newton-John; Elton's father is from a German-Jewish family and Elton's mother, who was raised in the Church of England, is of English background; has published 17 novels and written numerous rock operas and musicals.
 Ronald Harwood, playwright and screenwriter
 Tom Kempinski, playwright and screenwriter
 Stephen Laughton, playwright
 Patrick Marber, playwright and comedian
 Harold Pinter, playwright
 Jack Rosenthal, TV playwright
David Seidler (born 1937) playwright and film and television writer. best known for writing the scripts for the stage version and screen version for the story The King's Speech for which he won the Academy Award and a BAFTA for Best Original Screenplay; son of Doris Seidler (1912–2010), painter, printmaker and graphic artist.
 Peter and Anthony Shaffer, playwrights
 Tom Stoppard. playwright
 Alfred Sutro, playwright
Jackie Walker (activist), anti Zionist anti fascist playwright and pro Palestinian author of Sephardi Jewish and Jamaican origin.
 Arnold Wesker, playwright

Journalists
 David Aaronovitch, Neoconservatism and New Labour, hawkish pro Zionist journalist
 Barbara Amiel; Barbara Joan Estelle Amiel, Baroness Black of Crossharbour, DSS (born 4 December 1940), is a British-Canadian conservative journalist, writer, and socialite. She is married to former media proprietor Conrad Black.
Emma Barnett (born 5 February 1985); broadcaster and journalist for The Jewish Chronicle; main presenter of Woman's Hour on BBC Radio 4 since January 2021.
Rachel Beer, editor-in-chief of The Observer and The Sunday Times, born in Bombay to Sassoon David Sassoon, of the Iraqi Sassoon family. 
Rafael Behr (born June 1974)columnist at The Guardian,Financial Times; former political editor of the New Statesman. Behr was named political commentator of the year at the 2014 Comment Awards; in 2019, he was shortlisted for same award again.
Roger Bennett (journalist) (born 14 September 1970); journalist for Tablet (magazine) broadcaster, podcaster, and filmmaker; co-hosts Men in Blazers podcast and television show alongside Michael Davies; author Reborn in the USA: An Englishman's Love Letter to his Chosen Home; married to Vanessa Kroll, daughter of Kroll Inc. founder Jules Kroll; his brother-in-law is comedian Nick Kroll. Bennett is Jewish.
Chaim Bermant (1929–1998), journalist and novelist.
 Lionel Blue, rabbi and journalist
 Amber de Botton, head of UK news at ITV News; was previously head of politics at ITV and deputy head of politics at Sky News, after starting career as a parliamentary reporter; currently Prime Minister Rishi Sunak's director of communications.
Julian Borger; journalist and non-fiction writer; world affairs editor at The Guardian. He was a correspondent in the United States, Eastern Europe, the Middle East and the Balkans and covered the Bosnian War for the BBC. Borger is a contributor to the Center on International Cooperation, a foreign policy think tank based at New York University that works to enhance multilateral responses to global problems, including conflict, humanitarian crises, and recovery; international security challenges, including weapons proliferation and the changing balance of power; resource scarcity and climate change. 
Tom Brook (born 16 June 1953); broadcaster and journalist working primarily for BBC News, BBC World News, BBC News Channel and Talking Movies. Brook's parents were Caspar Brook, the first director of the Consumers’ Association in Britain, and Dinah, journalist for The Observer.
Tina Brown, Christina Hambley Brown, Lady Evans  (born 21 November 1953), is an English journalist, magazine editor, columnist, talk-show host, and author of The Diana Chronicles (2007) a biography of Diana, Princess of Wales, The Vanity Fair Diaries (2017) and The Palace Papers (2022). Born a British citizen of an Iraqi Jewish German Jewish mother and British father, she now holds joint citizenship after she took United States citizenship in 2005, following her emigration in 1984 to edit Vanity Fair.
Alex Brummer (born 25 May 1949); author of eight books; writes for Jewish News, Times of Israel,  city editor of the Daily Mail; financial editor of The Guardian ; regular contributor to The Jewish Chronicle  writing on business, media, the Holocaust,  Middle East policy; also writes "The Money" article for the New Statesman ; member of editorial board of Jewish Renaissance magazine; Vice-President of the Board of Deputies of British Jews; covered the 1980, 1984, and 1988 US presidential elections for The Guardian and won the 1989 Overseas Press Club award for best foreign correspondent in the US; worked as editor for the Financial Mail on Sunday ; voted Financial Journalist of the Year at the British Press Awards; covered the 2003 Iraq War for the Daily Mail from Washington, D.C.; led the newspaper's coverage on the 2007 run on Northern Rock, collapse of Lehman Brothers, and subsequent credit crunch. In 2009, Brummer appeared as witness at House of Commons Treasury Select Committee to answer questions on role of media in financial stability and "whether financial journalists should operate under any form of reporting restrictions during banking crises".
 Ian Buruma, author and journalist; board member of Human Rights in China; fellow of European Council of Foreign Relations; journalist for The New York Review of Books and has written for The Guardian; held fellowships at Wissenschaftskolleg and at Woodrow Wilson International Center for Scholars in Washington, D.C.; was Alistair Horne fellow of St Antony's College in Oxford.
Barbara Charone author of authorised biography of Keith Richards; Board Member of Chelsea F.C.; journalist and music critic for the NME , Rolling Stone , Sounds magazine and Creem; public relations and press director at WEA; founded the agency MBC PR where clients include Madonna, Depeche Mode, Primal Scream, Robert Plant, Pearl Jam, Rod Stewart and Christina Aguilera as well as comedians David Walliams, Graham Norton and Russell Brand; won the Music Week Press Award in 2006 and 2009; The Guardian included her on list of "The 20 most powerful celebrity makers" as "Britain's most powerful music PR", citing her reviving of careers of Madonna and Neil Diamond and establishing  Duffy and Mark Ronson. Charone is on Chelsea F.C. Board of directors.
Jo Coburn (born 12 November 1967); broadcaster and journalist with BBC News, married to former Downing Street head of strategic communications Mark Flanagan; regular presenter of Politics Live (and formerly also Sunday Politics along with Andrew Neil) and previously had special responsibility for BBC Breakfast; former BBC political correspondent for London, who covered the 2000 London Mayoral election; occasional relief presenter on the BBC News Channel. She has presented on BBC Radio 4 in the past and also has guested on the weekend current affairs programme The World This Weekend as well as reviewing the Sunday newspapers on The Andrew Marr Show.
Benjamin Cohen (journalist) (born 14 August 1982),web developer, entrepreneur and online publisher; founder of LGBT news site PinkNews;from 2006 until 2012 was technology correspondent for Channel 4 News. He is the Chief Executive of PinkNews, and regularly writes for the London Evening Standard.
Dave Cohen (writer); writer for television and radio as well as contributing columns to NME, Chortle and The Huffington Post.; has written for BBC Radio 4 including The Best of British, Dead Ringers which won a Sony Gold Award 2001, The Sunday Format, The News Quiz and 15 Minute Musical which he was also a co-creator and won the 2009 Writer's Guild Best Radio Comedy Show, to name a few. He also wrote for BBC Radio 5's The Treatment and They Came From Nowhere; has written for Rory Bremner Show, Spitting Image, Eleven O'Clock Show, Not Going Out and My Family. He has been a long time writer for Have I Got News For You and Horrible Histories which has won a variety of awards including Best Sketch Show, Best Comedy Show at the Children's BAFTAs and Best British Comedy Show.
Joseph Cohen, Conservative Zionist journalist for Jewish News; activist with the Israel Advocacy Movement and a founder member of Campaign Against Antisemitism.
Justin Cohen, News Editor and Co-Publisher, Jewish News; journalist for Medium, Yahoo Entertainment, HuffPost, The Independent, The Telegraph, USA Today, The Times Elsevier, Evening Standard, Times of Israel, HuffPost UK, The Times South Africa,City Limits,The Jewish News Podcast.
 Nick Cohen, Neoconservatism and New Labour, hawkish pro Zionist journalist; in 2006, he was a leading signatory to the Euston Manifesto
David Collier, journalist with the Jerusalem Post, Times of Israel, Jewish News, Algemeiner Journal, The Jewish Chronicle, The Jewish Press.
 Giles Coren
 John Diamond, journalist
Mark Elf, prolific anti-Zionist, anti-fascist journalist, pamphleteer and blogger; runs influential anti-Zionist journal Jews Sans FrontieresJessica Elgot, journalist for the Jewish Chronicle, Times of Israel,Jewish News and Deputy Political Editor at The Guardian; was assistant news editor of The Huffington Post UK HuffPost, senior reporter for the Jewish Chronicle and  The Independent; also provides commentary on news and politics programmes for the BBC, predominantly BBC Radio 5Live, and LBC.
 Gideon Falter, journalist for the Jewish Chronicle and chairman of the Campaign Against Antisemitism.
Mick Farren, Proto-punk musician, Fanzine and Underground press journalist, anarchist and author.
Richard Ferrer; journalist and editor of Jewish News; sub-editor at the Daily Mirror; written for the Daily Telegraph, The Times, Algemeiner, The Times of Israel and the Independent; regular contributor to programmes on BBC Radio 4.
 Lord Baron Daniel Finkelstein,(born 30 August 1962); journalist and politician; writes for Jewish Chronicle; former executive editor of The Times.; former chairman of Policy Exchange; chair of the think tank Onward; made a member of the House of Lords in August 2013, sitting as a Conservative.
Giles Fraser (born 27 November 1964)  English Anglican priest of Jewish ancestry, journalist and broadcaster ; regular contributor to Thought for the Day and The Guardian and a panellist on The Moral Maze, as well as an assistant editor of UnHerd ; voted Stonewall Hero of the Year in 2012; lectures on moral leadership for the British Army at Defence Academy.
 Jonathan Freedland, journalist and leading liberal Zionist; worked on kibbutz in Israel with the Labour Zionist Habonim Dror (where Freedland had been a mentor to Sacha Baron Cohen);later writing for The Guardian, Daily Mirror, the London Evening Standard, The Jewish Chronicle, The New York Times, The New York Review of Books, Newsweek and The New Republic; in 2022 wrote highly acclaimed stage play Jews. In Their Own Words which the Royal Court Theatre described as a "searing and incisive play looking at the roots and damning legacy of antisemitism in Britain"; son of  biographer and journalist Michael Freedland, and Israeli-born Sara Hocherman.
Michael Freedland (18 December 1934 – 1 October 2018); biographer, author, journalist and broadcaster; wrote for The Sunday Telegraph, The Spectator, The Guardian, The Observer,The Jewish Chronicle and The Economist; wrote and presented programmes for BBC Radio 2. His radio show You Don't Have To Be Jewish ran for 24 years.
Matt Frei (born 26 November 1963) is a British-German television news journalist and writer, formerly the Washington, D.C. correspondent for Channel 4 News. He is now the channel's Europe editor and presenter of the evening news.
Josh Glancy; Special Correspondent at The Sunday Times, pro Israel pro Zionist journalist and op ed writer for The Jewish Chronicle, The New York, Stuff.co.nz, New Zealand Herald, News24, Foreign Policy Magazine, Haaretz,Tablet (magazine) Men's Health, RealClear Politics, The Australian,The Spectator, Slate France, Vanity Fair (Italy), Sunday Times, The Times South Africa, The Forward, The Week (India), Jewish Journal (Los Angeles), Tablet Magazine, Grazia Magazine (UK), Politiken, The Gentleman's Journal, Men's Health (UK), The Spectator World, Spectator US.
Tanya Gold (born 31 December 1973) is an English journalist who has written for The Jewish Chronicle,The New York Times The Guardian, the Daily Mail, The Independent, The Daily Telegraph, The Sunday Times and the Evening Standard, and for The Spectator magazine.
Vivien Goldman is a British punk rock and reggae journalist and historian, writer and musician of German Jewish ancestry.
Jemima Goldsmith (born 30 January 1974) screenwriter, television, film and documentary producer and the founder of Instinct Productions, a television production company; formerly journalist and  editor of The New Statesman, served as the European editor-at-large for the American magazine Vanity Fair.
Siam Goorwich, journalist for The Guardian and The Jewish Chronicle.
Dominic Green (writer and musician)(born 1970) journalist for The Jewish Chronicle, The Spectator and a commissioning editor of The Critic. He is a columnist and film reviewer for The Spectator, and a columnist for The Daily Telegraph. He also writes frequently on books and arts for The Wall Street Journal, The New Criterion, The Spectator (UK), Standpoint, The Literary Review, and The Oldie. He has also written for The Atlantic, Commentary, The Economist, First Things, The Weekly Standard, CapX and the antiquities magazine Minerva.
Leo Green (born 30 August 1972) is a British musician, journalist and broadcaster for the BBC.
Lee Harpin, pro Israel, pro Zionist journalist for Daily Mail,The Times of Israel, The Jewish Chronicle, and Jewish News.
 Ernest Abraham Hart
 Simon Hattenstone (born 29 December 1962 in Salford, England); journalist and writer; features writer and interviewer for The Guardian. He has also written or ghost-written a number of biographical books.
Jonathan Hoffmann, prominent pro-Israel journalist who has written for The Jewish News and Tablet (magazine); former Vice Chair of The Zionist Federation of Great Britain and Ireland; former member of the Board of Deputies of British Jews; served as adviser to Labour Against Antisemitism.
Sam Holder, journalist and TV News Reporter, ITV News and ITV London
Josh Howie(born 22 February 1976) is a stand-up comedian, raised in London by his mother Lynne Franks and his father Paul Howie. Howie is also a journalist who began contributing to online men's lifestyle magazine Blokely in 2011. He also writes for The Jewish Chronicle on Israel, Zionism. culture and New antisemitism.
Simon Israel, was the Channel 4 News senior correspondent for 25 years ; specialised in reporting on terrorism, immigration, prisons, police, social and racial issues; covered numerous exclusives which include G20 protests, Stephen Lawrence murder, Victoria Climbie Inquiry, prison suicides and self harm, Windrush and police misconduct; also media consultant for MigrantVoice.
Joshua Jacobs, journalist for The Guardian, Bloomberg News, The Wall Street Journal, The Washington Post, Financial Times, The Atlantic, Times of Israel, Haaretz, National Review,Tablet (magazine).
Matthew Kalman foreign correspondent based in Jerusalem since 1998; has reported for Chronicle of Higher Education, MIT Technology Review, the Boston Globe, Time, Newsweek, San Francisco Chronicle, Daily News and USA Today,Daily Mail, London Sunday Times, and the Canadian The Globe and Mail; currently working with The Independent; appointed editor in chief of The Jerusalem Report in 2012; has also reported for Times of Israel, Haaretz, and is a television contributor for PBS in the United States, and Channel 4 News, UK, and CTV in Canada; also works on BBC radio.
Nicole Lampert, pro Israel, pro Zionist journalist for Daily Mail, The Independent, The Telegraph, Metro (UK), New York Post, News.com.au, Newsweek, Sydney Morning Herald, New Zealand Herald, The Times of Israel, The Jewish Chronicle, and Jewish News.
Ian Katz (born 9 February 1968) of South African Jewish origin; journalist and broadcasting executive currently Chief Content Officer at Channel 4, overseeing all editorial decision making and commissioning across Channel 4's linear channels, streaming services and social media. Katz originally followed a career in print journalism, and was a deputy editor of The Guardian until 2013. He then became the editor of the Newsnight current affairs programme on BBC Two, a role which he left in late 2017 to join Channel 4.
 Adam Langleben, journalist for The Jewish Chronicle, Haaretz, Times of Israel, HuffPost UK, New Statesman, The New European, The Jewish News Podcast; national secretary of Jewish Labour Movement which is a member of coalition of Avodah/Meretz/Arzenu/Ameinu within the World Zionist Organization and its sister parties are the Israeli Labor Party (Havodah) and Meretz; affiliated to the Board of Deputies of British Jews.
 Dominic Lawson, journalist
 Nigella Lawson, cookery writer
Norman Lebrecht (born 11 July 1948) is a British music journalist and author who specialises in classical music. Lebrecht worked at the Kol Yisrael news department, part of the Israel Broadcasting Authority. He returned to London in 1972, where he was a news executive Visnews Ltd. from 1973 to 1978;was a special contributor to The Sunday Times until 1991; in 2019, Lebrecht published Genius and Anxiety: How Jews Changed the World, 1847–1947. It was published by Oneworld (UK) in October 2019 and by Simon & Schuster (USA) in December 2019.
Natasha Lehrer; journalist, writer and literary translator; her translations have received multiple awards, and been shortlisted for several prizes; was joint winner of Scott Moncrieff Prize for translation of Nathalie Léger's Suite for Barbara Loden. Her writing has appeared in The Guardian, The Observer, the Times Literary Supplement, The Nation, Haaretz, Frieze Magazine, The Paris Review; former judge of the Jewish Quarterly-Wingate Prize.
Bernard Levin  (19 August 1928 – 7 August 2004) was an English journalist, author and broadcaster, described by The Times as "the most famous journalist of his day".
Hugh Levinson; senior producer with BBC Current Affairs Radio; has produced many editions of BBC Radio 4's international current affairs series Crossing Continents, and produced numerous documentaries; journalist for Tablet magazine; won the UK Amnesty International Radio Award in 2002 and the London Jewish Cultural Centre Media Award in 2004.
Eylon Aslan-Levy, International Media Advisor to the President of the State of Israel, served in the IDF and as chairman of the National Council of the Union of Jewish Students in Britain; member of the Board of Deputies of British Jews; founder of the Everyday Antisemitism Project; journalist for The Guardian, Tablet (magazine) The Telegraph, BuzzFeed, Newsweek, Jerusalem Post, Times of Israel, The Daily Caller, Arutz Sheva/Israel National News.
Martin Lewis (financial journalist)CBE (born 9 May 1972) financial journalist and broadcaster, has worked for BBC,Channel 5 (British TV channel),ITV's This Morning (TV programme) and written for The Sunday Post, The Yorkshire Post, the Manchester Evening News, Express & Star, has been a columnist for The Sunday Times, News of the World, The Guardian and the Sunday Express.
 Emily Maitlis, TV newscaster and reporter
Tim Lott(born 23 January 1956); author and journalist for The Guardian. He worked as a music journalist and ran a magazine publishing business, launching Flexipop magazine in 1980 with ex-Record Mirror journalist Barry Cain.
Monty Meth  (3 March 1926 – 14 March 2021) was a British journalist who was editor of the Daily Mail; was member of the Young Communist League;appointed Member of the Order of the British Empire (MBE) in the 2007 Queen's Birthday Honours for services to the communities of Enfield and Bethnal Green.; author of Here to Stay: A Study of Good Practices in the Employment of Coloured Workers 1972; Brothers to all Men? A Report on Trade Union Actions and Attitudes on Race Relations.
Sabrina Miller; pro-Israel pro Zionist journalist and activist writing for the conservative newspaper The Mail on Sunday, Jewish News,The Jewish Chronicle and The Daily Telegraph
Richard Millett, pro-Israel pro Zionist journalist and activist writing for Algemeiner Journal,The Times of Israel and The Jewish Press, highlighting and challenging rising anti-Semitism in Britain, specifically Antisemitism in the UK Labour Party and the danger of New antisemitism.
Peter Mason is a journalist for The Jewish Chronicle and national secretary of the Jewish Labour Movement.
Charles Shaar Murray; proto-punk music journalist for the New Musical Express, of Viennese Jewish origin.He wrote for IT (International Times), before moving to the New Musical Express in 1972 for which he wrote until around 1986; subsequently worked for Q magazine, Mojo, MacUser, New Statesman, Prospect, The Guardian, The Observer, The Daily Telegraph, Vogue, and The Independent.
Stephen Oryszczuk; Foreign Editor, Jewish News, Times of Israel, The Jewish News Podcast
Robert Peston (born 1960), BBC news business correspondent; author of Who Runs Britain? How the Super-Rich are Changing our Lives ; son of Maurice Peston, Baron Peston (1931–2016), an economist and Labour life peer who had worked on the Lords Constitution Committee and on committee reviewing the BBC Charter and was chairman of the Pools Panel.
Anshel Pfeffer(Hebrew: אנשיל פפר, born 22 June 1973); British -Israeli journalist; a senior correspondent and columnist for Haaretz, covering military, Jewish and international affairs, and Israel correspondent for The Economist.; has also written for The Guardian, The New York Times, The Washington Post and The Times; received the B'nai B'rith award for "Recognizing Excellence in Diaspora Reportage" 
Melanie Phillips,(born 4 June 1951) Neoconservatism, and right wing hawkish pro Zionist journalist; began her career writing for The Guardian and New Statesman; during the 1990s, she came to identify with ideas more associated with the right and currently writes for The Times, The Jerusalem Post, and The Jewish Chronicle, covering political and social issues from a social conservative perspective.Irving Kristol, defines her as a liberal who has "been mugged by reality";was panellist on BBC Radio 4 programme The Moral Maze and BBC One's Question Time; was awarded the Orwell Prize for Journalism
Eve Pollard Evelyn, Lady Lloyd,  (née Pollard, formerly Winkleman, born 25 December 1943) ; has been the editor of several tabloid newspapers; was fashion editor at Honey magazine; also worked for Daily Mirror ;  was launch editor-in-chief of Elle magazine in the US and edited Sunday magazine for the News of the World and You magazine for the Mail on Sunday; also worked in television as features editor of TV-am (1982–1983) and devised Frocks on the Box for ITV contractor TVS.; often appeared on radio and TV; was regular participant in Through the Keyhole; was a guest panellist on the talk show Loose Women; in 2016, was appointed the first Chair of Reporters without Borders in the UK. In June 2019, was awarded the prestigious Journalist Laureate prize by the London Press Club. She has been a member, appointed in 1999, of the Competition Commission’s Newspaper Takeover Panel. Pollard was appointed Officer of the Order of the British Empire (OBE) in the 2008 Birthday Honours List for services to journalism.
Stephen Pollard (born 18 December 1964); was editor of The Jewish Chronicle; was researcher for Labour MP Peter Shore; worked for the Fabian Society; joined the Social Market Foundation; Senior Fellow at Civitas; was president for the Centre for the New Europe and in 2007,  first chair of the European Institute for the Study of Contemporary Antisemitism;signatory founder of the Henry Jackson Society, a neoconservative British foreign policy think tank."...[The West's] failures in the former Yugoslavia (especially Bosnia) were more than just moral. Through their impact on the credibility of our international institutions, such as NATO and the EU, they had a profound effect on the national interests of western powers. These fiascos showed that we had to engage, robustly and sometimes preventatively. The early interventions in Kosovo and Sierra Leone, although imperfect, provide an appropriate model for future action." The Henry Jackson Society's Statement of Principles 
Karen Pollock   journalist, writer, activist chief executive of  Holocaust Educational Trust (HET) ; was Director of the All-Party Parliamentary Group against Antisemitism; later joined Holocaust Educational Trust (HET) ; is involved with the anti-fascist organisation Searchlight and London Jewish Forum, as well as the Holocaust Memorial Day Trust. She has written for The Guardian, Jewish News, The Jewish Chronicle, and The Huffington Post ; gave TED talk entitled 'The search for humanity in the Holocaust' for TEDxDurhamUniversity 2016.She represented British Jews at United Nations World Conference against Racism. She is a vice-president of the Jewish Leadership Council. She was appointed Member of the Order of the British Empire (MBE) in the 2012 New Year Honours for services to education, specifically about the Holocaust, and Commander of the Order of the British Empire (CBE) in the 2020 Birthday Honours for services to Holocaust education.
 Marjorie Proops, agony aunt
 The Express and Quest's World of Wonder; Quest wrote the book, The Vanishing of Flight MH370: The True Story of the Hunt for the Missing Malaysian Plane, published by Penguin Random House on 8 March 2016.
Kimberly Quinn (formerly Fortier; née Solomon; born 1961) ; journalist, commentator and magazine publisher and writer; publisher of British conservative news magazine The Spectator; has written for The Wall Street Journal, Vogue and UK newspapers The Daily Telegraph, The Times, Evening Standard, and The Independent; was the Communications and Marketing Director for Condé Nast Publications in the UK.
Gideon Rachman (born 1963) is a British journalist of Jewish South African ancestry; adherent of Neoconservatism and right wing hawkish pro Zionism ;was chief foreign affairs commentator of the Financial Times in July 2006. In 2016, won the Orwell Prize for political journalism and was awarded the Commentator Award at the European Press Prize awards; also worked with BBC World Service in 1984 and from 1988 to 1990, was a reporter for The Sunday Correspondent newspaper, Washington, D.C.; spent 15 years at The Economist newspaper.
 Barnaby Raine is an anti fascist, anti Zionist, pro-Palestinian author, journalist, intellectual and broadcaster, writing for New Internationalist, n+1, Salvage, Red Pepper, Novara Media, Jacobin, Counterfire and others.
 Claire Rayner, agony aunt
Jay Rayner (born 14 September 1966) food critic for The Guardian, The Mail on Sunday, GQGQ, Esquire, Cosmopolitan, New Statesman and Granta; first novel, The Marble Kiss, published in 1994, shortlisted for Author's Club First Novel Award; second novel, Day of Atonement (1998) shortlisted for the Jewish Quarterly Prize for Fiction
Nick Robinson (journalist), BBC broadcaster of German Jewish ancestry; was president of the Oxford University Conservative Association; president of the Conservative Party youth group; was deputy editor of Panorama; worked for ITV News as political editor; presented Westminster Live, Weekend Breakfast and Late Night Live on BBC Radio 5 Live, and Newsnight on BBC Two; covered general election for BBC Radio; co-hosted BBC Two's Icons: The Greatest Person of the 20th Century alongside Claudia Winkleman; hosted final debate between Boris Johnson and Jeremy Corbyn prior to 2019 general election; author of two books.
 Jon Ronson, journalist, author, documentary filmmaker and radio presenter
Dan Sabbagh, Defence and Security Editor and Journalist for The GuardianTerence Sach, Information Security Specialist at The BBC
Jonathan Sacerdoti, writer, campaigner, broadcaster, journalist and TV producer; covers stories relating to the UK and Europe, as well as terrorism and extremism stories, race relations, Middle East analysis and the British royal family. He is also a campaigner against antisemitism.
James Schneider (born 17 June 1987) political organiser, journalist; co-founded the left-wing grassroots movement Momentum; was PR advisor to Jeremy Corbyn as Director of Strategic Communications; joined Think Africa Press in 2010, a role he held until he became the senior correspondent at New African; has written articles for publications such as The Independent, the New Statesman, Novara Media, and LabourList.
Michael Segalov; of Polish Jewish ancestry; News Editor at Huck; writes regularly for The Independent, Vice, BBC and The Guardian.
 L. J. K. Setright, motoring journalist
Rachel Shabi; British journalist and author; contributing writer to The Guardian and the author of Not the Enemy, Israel's Jews from Arab Lands, which argued that Israel has discriminated against and culturally stripped its population of Jews from Arab and Muslim countries. The book received a National Jewish Book Award.Born in Israel to Iraqi Jewish parents in Ramat Gan, Shabi grew up in the UK.
Miriam Shaviv (born 24 August 1976), columnist for “The Jewish Chronicle”, “Haaretz”, “The Times of Israel”, “The Forward”; former literary editor of The Jerusalem Post; Features Editor of the “Times Higher Education” magazine.
Bob Stanley (born Robert Andrew Shukman; 25 December 1964); musician, journalist, author, film producer; member of indie pop group Saint Etienne and music journalist for NME, Melody Maker, Mojo, The Guardian and The Times, as well as writing three books on music and football; also has a career as a DJ and as a producer of record labels, and has collaborated on a series of films about London. His second publication, Yeah! Yeah! Yeah!: The Story of Modern Pop, published by Faber & Faber; third publication Let's Do It: The Birth of Pop Music: A History, published by Pegasus. 
Zoe Strimpel(born 8 July 1982); journalist, author, and commentator on gender and relationships. She is a columnist for The Sunday Telegraph where she writes a weekly column, commenting on gender, feminism, dating, relationships and identity politics.
Daniel Sugarman was staff reporter for the Jewish Chronicle,The Times,The Telegraph, Director of Public Affairs for Board of Deputies of British Jews.  
David Shukman (born 30 May 1958) journalist, and the former science editor of BBC News.
Alexandra Shulman  (born 13 November 1957); daughter of the critic Milton Shulman and the writer Drusilla Beyfus; previously worked at Arista Records; columnist for The Daily Telegraph and Daily Mail; first novel, Can We Still Be Friends?, published in 2012; was assessed as one of the 100 most powerful women in the United Kingdom by Woman's Hour on BBC Radio 4. Shulman was appointed Officer of the Order of the British Empire in the 2005 New Year Honours for services to the magazine industry. She was later promoted to Commander of the Order of the British Empire in the 2018 New Year Honours for services to fashion journalism; was formerly a trustee of the National Portrait Gallery.
Jake Wallis Simons; Editor of the Jewish Chronicle, writer for The Jerusalem Post, The Times of Israel, Haaretz, the Spectator, a commentator for Sky News and a broadcaster for BBC Radio 4 and the World Service; was Associate Global Editor for the Daily Mail Online, and features writer for the Sunday Telegraph; also worked for the Times, The Guardian, CNN, POLITICO, Newsweek and La Repubblica.
Peter Simons aka Penny Reel,  of Russian Jewish ancestry, socialist and anti-fascist, contributed to the UK Underground press, pioneering reggae historian, scholar, promotor, archivist , author, and journalist for the NME, Sounds, and Echoes; composed sleeve notes for Bunny Lee, King Tubby’s and Tappa Zukie’s MPLA release on Front Line record label; wrote prolifically on Keith Hudson, and, under a pseudonym, also wrote local histories of Hackney and the development of working class London culture; highly influential in introducing roots reggae and Dub music to the British people in the 1960s and 1970s and 2000s; biographer of Dennis Brown.
Ruth Smeeth (née Anderson; born 29 June 1979);Labour Party politician;became director of public affairs and campaigns at the Britain Israel Communications and Research Centre (BICOM) in November 2005,; writes for Index on Censorship, The Guardian, Daily Mail, The Independent, The Telegraph, Daily Express, The Sunday Times, The Times, Times of Israel, HuffPost UK, New Statesman;was a deputy director of anti-racist organisation, Hope not Hate. She has also been employed by the Community Security Trust and has worked for the Board of Deputies of British Jews and she is a member of Labour Friends of Israel.; became chief executive of Index on Censorship, an organisation which campaigns for freedom of speech.
 Jon Sopel, journalist; presents The Politics Show on BBC One; one of the lead presenters on News 24; voted 'Political Journalist of the Year' by Public Affairs Industry; shortlisted for 'National Presenter of the Year' at the Royal Television Society television journalism awards 2011/2012.
Hedi Stadlen (6 January 1916 – 21 January 2004), British, of Austrian Jewish ancestry, journalist, pamphleteer, Communist, Musicologist, better known in Sri Lanka as Hedi Keuneman''', was an Austrian Jewish philosopher, political activist, and musicologist. She was one of the handful of European Radicals in Sri Lanka. Matthew Stadlen is her grandson.
Matthew Stadlen (born 7 December 1979)  was weekend presenter on LBC ; previously presented the BBC interview series Five Minutes With... and the BBC documentary series "On the Road with..." His interviews and documentaries have appeared across the BBC television network, including on BBC One, Two and Four; also wrote column with The Daily Telegraph, "The Matthew Stadlen Interview"; has presented over 150 live events and podcasts for How To Academy; was born to Sir Nicholas Stadlen, a High Court judge, and Frances Stadlen in London. He is the grandson of concert pianist Peter Stadlen and Hedi Stadlen, the activist and musicologist, both Austrian Jews born in Vienna.
Mark Steyn(born December 8, 1959) is a British-Canadian author and a radio and television presenter. He has written several books. He is Anglican, but has Jewish maternal ancestry. Steyn's great-aunt was artist Stella Steyn. His mother's family was Belgian.
John Suchet, newsreader, journalist and brother of actor David Suchet, son of Jack Suchet, of Russian Jewish ancestry. He is the father of Russia Today RT journalist and presenter Rory Suchet.
Helen Szamuely (June 25, 1950 – April 5, 2017), historian and Eurosceptic, researcher for the Bruges Group (United Kingdom); daughter of Lenin Boys leader, Tibor Szamuely, wrote for the BBC Russian Service, History Today,Standpoint, New Statesman, Guardian, Salisbury Review, EUobserver and Social Affairs Unit ; sister of George Szamuely.
David Toube, pro Israel, pro Zionist neoconservative activist, writes for The Jewish Chronicle,Jewish News,Times of Israel,The Guardian,CNN, The Telegraph, Metro (UK), The Spectator, New Statesman; major contributor to Harry's Place, (leading online Zionist pro-Israel journal that closely monitors pro Palestinian sympathisers and Jewish activists supporting anti Zionism) and director of policy at Quilliam, a British think tank co-founded by Maajid Nawaz that focused on counter extremism, specifically against Islamism. Toube was one of the signatories of the Euston Manifesto.
Adam Wagner ; journalist and op-ed writer for The Jewish Chronicle, Times of Israel,Haaretz,The Guardian, Forbes,Daily Mirror,HuffPostUK, New Statesman; barrister, a member of the Equality and Human Rights Commission's panel of counsel. In 2019 he represented Campaign Against Antisemitism (CAA) in its case a formal investigation under section 20 of the Equality Act 2006 into whether Labour Party had "unlawfully discriminated against, harassed or victimised people because they are Jewish"; specialist in human rights and public law, including COVID-19 lockdown rules.
 Victor Weisz, Vicky, cartoonist
 Ben Westerman, pro-Israel pro Zionist journalist and activist writing for Jewish News highlighting and challenging rising anti-Semitism in Britain, specifically Antisemitism in the UK Labour Party and the danger of New antisemitism;is Research Fellow at the Constitution Society specialising in the internal anthropology of political parties; also works as an adviser on the implications of Brexit and has previously worked for the Labour Party on the Remain campaign and in Parliament.
Naomi Wimborne-Idrissi, anti Fascist, anti-Zionist campaigner, activist and journalist who has written for Al Jazeera English, Jewish Voice for Labour, International Business Times UK focusing on Palestinian rights; anti-Corbynism and critique of the concept of the New antisemitism; holds seat on National Executive Committee of the Labour Party.
 Eva Wiseman, commissioning editor on the Observer magazine; journalist for Vogue, Elle'', and regularly writes on Israel and anti-Semitism in British society, and the concept of the New antisemitism.
Henry Zeffman, Associate Political Editor, The Times,The Guardian, The Sunday Times, The Australian, New Statesman; winner of Anthony Howard (journalist) Award.

See also
List of Scottish Jews#Arts, literature and music
Lists of Jews
List of British Jews

References

Sources
 JYB = Jewish Year Book

External links 
 Jinfo

Writers
writers
British Jewish
British Jewish
British